Cercospora is a genus of ascomycete fungi. Most species have no known sexual stage, and when the sexual stage is identified, it is in the genus Mycosphaerella. Most species of this genus cause plant diseases, and form leaf spots. It is a relatively well-studied genus of fungi, but there are countless species not yet described, and there is still much to learn about the best-known of the species.

Selected species 
Cercospora acetosella - found on sheep sorrel and other docks
Cercospora aciculina 
Cercospora agerati
Cercospora alabemensis
Cercospora alismatis
Cercospora althaeina
Cercospora angreci - causes leaf spot of orchids
Cercospora angulata
Cercospora apii - causes leaf spot on celery, and found on other plants, including Impatiens
Cercospora apii f.sp. clerodendri
Cercospora apiicola - causes leaf spot on celery
Cercospora arachidicola - causes peanut leaf spot
Cercospora arctii 
Cercospora arctii-ambrosiae
Cercospora asparagi - found on asparagus
Cercospora atro-marginalis
Cercospora atrofiliformis - causes "black stripe" on sugarcane
Cercospora beticola - causes leaf spot on Beta vulgaris and spinach
Cercospora bolleana - found on figs
Cercospora bougainvilleae
Cercospora brachiata
Cercospora byliana
Cercospora brachypus - found on grapes
Cercospora brassicicola - infests many cole crops
Cercospora brunkii - found on Pelargonium  and Geranium.
Cercospora bunchosiae
Cercospora canescens
Cercospora cannabis -  causes olive leaf spot on Cannabis spp., and is found on hops
Cercospora cantuariensis - found on hops
Cercospora capsici - causes "frogeye" leaf spot on peppers
Cercospora caribaea
Cercospora carotae - causes carrot leaf blight
Cercospora circumscissa 
Cercospora citrullina - causes "cucurbit leaf spot" on watermelon and cucumber plants
Cercospora clemensiae
Cercospora coffeicola - infests coffee plants
Cercospora coryli - found on hazels
Cercospora corylina - found on hazels
Cercospora eleusine - causes leaf spot of Finger millet
Cercospora cf. flagellaris syn. C. piaropi
Cercospora fragariae - causes strawberry leaf spot
Cercospora fuchsiae
Cercospora fusca
Cercospora fusimaculans - found on many grasses
Cercospora gerberae
Cercospora halstedii
Cercospora handelii
Cercospora hayi
Cercospora hydrangeae
Cercospora kaki
Cercospora kikuchii - causes leaf blight and purple seed stain on soybean
Cercospora lentis - found on lentil
Cercospora liquidambaris
Cercospora longipes - causes brown spot on sugarcane
Cercospora longissima - found in several types of lettuce
Cercospora malloti - found on Mallotus species in Thailand
Cercospora mamaonis - found on papaya
Cercospora mangiferae - causes mango leaf spot
Cercospora medicaginis - found on alfalfa
Cercospora melongenae 
Cercospora minima - found on pear leaves
Cercospora minuta
Cercospora musae - found on banana
Cercospora nicotianae - causes "frogeye" spot on tobacco
Cercospora odontoglossi
Cercospora oryzae 
Cercospora papayae - found on papaya
Cercospora penniseti - causes leaf spot on pearl millet
Cercospora personata - causes brown or blackish leaf spots in ground nuts tikka disease
Cercospora piaropi - see syn. C. cf. flagellaris above
Cercospora pisa-sativae - causes leaf spot on peas
Cercospora platanicola - found on sycamores
Cercospora puderii
Cercospora pulcherrima
Cercospora rhapidicola
Cercospora rosicola - found on roses
Cercospora rubrotincta - found on various drupes
Cercospora sojina - causes frogeye leaf spot on soybean
Cercospora solani - infests potato plants
Cercospora solani-tuberosi
Cercospora sorghi
Cercospora theae
Cercospora tuberculans
Cercospora vexans
Cercospora vicosae
Cercospora zeae-maydis - causes a disease in cereals called grey leaf spot
Cercospora zebrina
Cercospora zonata

References

Further reading
 Chupp C, 1954. A monograph of the fungus genus Cercospora. Ithaca, New York, USA: C. Chupp.
 Groenewald, M., et al. (2006). Host range of Cercospora apii and C. beticola and description of C. apiicola, a novel species from celery. Mycologia 98:2

External links
 
 Photos of Impatiens leaf spot
 IPM for carrot leaf blight
 Cercospora Primer

 
Fungal plant pathogens and diseases
Mycosphaerellaceae genera
Taxa described in 1863
Taxa named by Karl Wilhelm Gottlieb Leopold Fuckel